Closer to Truth is a television series on public television originally created, produced and hosted by Robert Lawrence Kuhn. The original series aired in 2000 for two seasons, followed by a second series aired in 2003 for a single season. The third series of the program, Closer to Truth: Cosmos. Consciousness. God, launched in 2008, with 20 full seasons to date. Closer to Truth airs on over 200 PBS and public television stations and has had over 200,000 station broadcasts.

The show is centered on on-camera conversations with leading scientists, philosophers, theologians, and scholars, covering a diverse range of topics or questions, from the cause, size and nature of the universe (or multiverse), to the mystery of consciousness and the notion of free will, to the existence and essence of God, to the mystery of existence (i.e., why there is anything at all).

The Closer to Truth website features extensive conversations in addition to those that have been broadcast on TV (approximately 4,000 videos). It is the world's largest archive of video interviews with leading experts in the philosophy of cosmology and physics, consciousness, and the philosophy of religion. Kuhn's presentation, Asking Ultimate Questions, is the foundation of Closer To Truth.

The Closer To Truth YouTube channel has 446,000+ subscribers; 59 million+ Total views and 200 million+ minutes watch time.

Robert Lawrence Kuhn is the creator, executive producer, writer and presenter of the series. Peter Getzels is the co-creator, producer and director.

Content focus

Cosmos

 Cosmology
 Multiverse
 Quantum physics
 Time
 Fine-tuning
 Far future
 Complexity
 Emergence
 Philosophy of cosmology / physics
 Metaphysics
 Mystery of existence
 Why is there anything at all?

Consciousness

 Mind-body problem
 Brain / mind
 Brain function
 Mental activities
 Free will
 Personal identity
 Subconscious
 Mental illness
 Life after death
 Alien intelligence
 Parapsychology
 Essence of consciousness
 Critical thinking about brain / mind

Meaning (God)

 Philosophy of religion 
 Philosophical theology 
 Science and religion 
 Nature and attributes of God 
 God's involvement in the world
 Theological futures 
 Critical thinking about God

Episodes

References

External links
 
 Closer to Truth on YouTube
 
 Closer to Truth on Pinterest

PBS original programming
Philosophy television series
2000 American television series debuts
2000s American documentary television series
2010s American documentary television series
Educational television
Documentary films about philosophy